Paul Hunt  may refer to:

 Paul Hunt (academic), British professor and Chief Commissioner of the New Zealand Human Rights Commission.
 Paul Hunt (footballer) (born 1970), former Forest Green Rovers player
 Paul Hunt (gymnast), American gymnastics coach 
Paul Hunt (activist) British disability rights activist (1937-1979)